The February 1974 United Kingdom general election in Northern Ireland was held on 28 February with 12 MPs elected in single-seat constituencies using first-past-the-post as part of the wider general election in the United Kingdom.

Results
The election took place soon after the Sunningdale Agreement, signed 9 December 1973. On 1 January 1974, an Executive was formed under the terms of the Agreement, based on the result of the 1973 Northern Ireland Assembly election, with Ulster Unionist Party leader Brian Faulkner as Chief Executive. It had six members from the UUP, four from the nationalist SDLP and one from the Alliance Party. These parties had both been founded in 1970.

Later in January 1974, the Ulster Unionist Council voted against participation in the Executive and Faulkner lost the leadership of the UUP to Harry West. West formed the United Ulster Unionist Council with the Vanguard Unionist Progressive Party (VUPP), founded in 1972 by William Craig, and the Democratic Unionist Party (DUP), founded in 1971 by Ian Paisley. They agreed that only one anti-Sunningdale Unionist would stand in each constituency. This strategy proved successful, with the UUUC winning 11 of the 12 seats. Seven supporters of Faulkner stood as Pro-Assembly Unionists, including outgoing MPs Stanley McMaster and Rafton Pounder.

On the nationalist side, former Republican Labour Party leader Gerry Fitt had formed the Social Democratic and Labour Party (SDLP). Fitt held his seat in Belfast West, but the split in the nationalist vote in Fermanagh and South Tyrone allowed Harry West to gain a seat from Unity. Bernadette McAliskey, who had held a seat for Unity since 1969 for Mid Ulster, contested as an independent but lost, again where a split in the nationalist vote allowed a new Unionist MP to gain.

In the election as a whole, the Conservative Party failed to return to government and the Labour Party formed a minority government led by Harold Wilson as Prime Minister.

MPs elected

References

 

Northern Ireland
General elections in Northern Ireland to the Parliament of the United Kingdom
1974 elections in Northern Ireland